Colorado's 5th Senate district is one of 35 districts in the Colorado Senate. It has been represented by Republican Perry Will since 2023 following the resignation of fellow Republican Bob Rankin. Prior to redistricting the district was represented by Democrats Kerry Donovan and Gail Schwartz.

Geography
District 5 is based in the mountain towns of the Rockies, covering all of Chaffee, Delta, Eagle, Gunnison,  Hinsdale, Lake, and Pitkin Counties. Communities in the district include Vail, Avon, Basalt, Eagle, Gypsum, Minturn, Edwards, El Jebel, Eagle-Vail, Aspen, Snowmass Village, Leadville, Leadville North, Salida, Buena Vista, Gunnison, Crested Butte, Powderhorn, Delta, Cedaredge, Orchard City, Paonia, and  Lake City.

The district is located primarily within Colorado's 3rd congressional district, also overlapping with the 2nd and 5th congressional districts. It overlaps with the 26th, 54th, 59th, 60th, and 61st districts of the Colorado House of Representatives.

Recent election results
Colorado state senators are elected to staggered four-year terms. The old 5th district held elections in midterm years, but the new district drawn following the 2020 Census will hold elections in presidential years.

Incumbent Senator Kerry Donovan is term-limited in 2022 regardless, but two Republican senators, Don Coram and Bob Rankin, live within the new boundaries of the 5th district. Coram, whose term ends this year, was unable to run for re-election because the seat isn't up until 2024, and Rankin will represent the district beginning in 2023.

On December 1st, 2022 Rankin announced his intention to resign effective January 10th, 2023. A Republican Vacancy Committee appointed former state Representative Perry Will to the seat. Will has hinted that it is his intent to run for a full term when the seat is up in 2024.

2018

2014

Federal and statewide results in District 5

References 

5
Chaffee County, Colorado
Delta County, Colorado
Eagle County, Colorado
Gunnison County, Colorado
Hinsdale County, Colorado
Lake County, Colorado
Pitkin County, Colorado